Edwin Asa Dix, the pen name of Edwin Augustus Dix (June 25, 1860 – August 24, 1911), was an American author.

Biography
Dix was born in Newark, New Jersey, to John Edwin and Mary Joy Dix. He attended the Newark Latin School, then Princeton University from which he graduated in 1881 as Latin Salutatorian, and first in his class with highest grade point average awarded to that date (98.5%). While at Princeton he was managing editor of The Lit and was awarded the Boudinot Historical Fellowship and other prizes. In 1884 he graduated from Columbia Law School with highest honors, and subsequently admitted to the bar in New York and New Jersey.

Dix toured the world from 1890-92. On August 15, 1895, he married Marion Alden Olcott at Cherry Valley, New York. They had no children, and spent much of their married life abroad, wintering in Egypt, Switzerland, and Colorado. He died suddenly in New York City of myocarditis.

Dix was an active author of fiction and travel articles in various magazines, as well as travel books, novels, and a history of Samuel de Champlain. He also served as Literary Editor of The Churchman. In addition, he composed "Musical Critic's Dream" which was played extensively by John Philip Sousa's band.

Selected works 
 
 A midsummer drive through the Pyrenees, New York London, G.P.Putnam's sons 1890.
 Deacon Bradbury: a novel, New York, The Century Co., 1900.
 Old Bowen’s legacy: a novel, New York, The Century Co., 1901.
 Champlain, the founder of New France, New York, D. Appleton and company, 1903.
 Prophet's Landing: a novel, New York, C. Scribner's Sons, 1907.
 After twenty years, Princeton University Class of 1881. New York, 1901.
 After twenty-five years, Princeton University Class of 1881. New York, 1906.
 Bulletin of class news, Princeton University Class of 1881. New York, 1908.

References 

 Dix Clemens Family Archive
 James Richard Joy, Thomas Joy and His Descendants in the Lines of His Sons Samuel of Boston, Joseph of Hingham, ..., privately printed, 1900. Page 150.

External links
 
 

American male writers
1860 births
1911 deaths